Peter Litherland (1756–1805) was an English watchmaker and inventor. He was born in Warrington and later moved to Liverpool, which was then the centre of the watchmaking trade. In 1791 he patented the rack lever escapement for watches, which was more accurate than the commonly used verge escapement. One of his watches is on display in the World Museum in  Liverpool.

References

External links
Portrait of Peter Litherland (1756–1804) by John Williamson

English watchmakers (people)
People from Warrington
1756 births
1805 deaths
Businesspeople from Liverpool